The Sabrewing Rhaegal is a proposed American unmanned cargo aircraft developed by Californian Sabrewing Aircraft.

Design 

Development 
By February 2018, Sabrewing was to fly a 65%-scale vehicle in the fall.
By February 2019, a one-eighth-scale model was going to be tested while the first full-size aircraft construction had begun, to fly by the end of 2019 and to enter service in 2023.
The half-scale Rhaegal-B was completed and officially revealed to the public during the U.S. Air Force "Agility Prime" program unveiling.

At the January 2020 Vertical Flight Society symposium, Sabrewing announced a larger Rhaegal-B was being completed, to be revealed within weeks.
It should load a single LD1 or LD3 container, or two LD2 containers, through the nose without special cargo handling equipment.
FAR Part 23 certification negotiations were to be completed within weeks, to deliver cargo autonomously in any weather and any airspace.

In July 2020, Sabrewing announced that it had received the first Agility Prime contract from the United States Air Force worth $3.3 million USD for "evaluation" of Sabrewing's Rhaegal RG-1 aircraft.  In September 2020, Sabrewing announced that it had received a firm order for 102 aircraft from Arabian Development and Marketing Company (ADMC), a company with IT, telecom, logistics and transportation and media interests, in a deal worth over $600 million. The deliveries of aircraft are to begin in 2022 to support the air cargo transportation needs of the Saudi Arabian Neom project.

In October of 2022, Sabrewing  announced that its RH-1-A drone had lifted a payload of 829 pounds (374 kg) on its first hover flight, saying that this was a heavier payload than had previously been “dead-lifted” by any commercial, vertical takeoff, uncrewed air vehicle.

See also

References

External links
 

United States cargo aircraft
Proposed aircraft of the United States